Queen Alexandra Hospital is a hospital in Portsmouth.

Queen Alexandra Hospital may also refer to:
Queen Alexandra Hospital, Hobart

See also
Queen Alexandra Military Hospital, London, England
Royal Alexandra Hospital for Children, Westmead, Sydney, Australia